Tim Hunter (born June 15, 1947, in Los Angeles, California) is an American television and film director.

Career
Since the late 1980s he has mostly worked on television, directing episodes for dozens of televisions series including Breaking Bad, Carnivàle, Chicago Hope, Crossing Jordan, Deadwood, Falcon Crest, Homicide: Life on the Street, House, Law & Order, Lie to Me, Mad Men, Twin Peaks, Glee, Revenge, Pretty Little Liars and American Horror Story. During the early to mid-1980s, Hunter directed several feature films, including 1986's River's Edge, which won that year's award for Best Picture at the Independent Spirit Awards.

Critical reception
Janet Maslin made the following comments about Hunter's work on the films River's Edge and Tex:

Personal life
Hunter was born in Los Angeles, the son of British screenwriter Ian McLellan Hunter.  He attended Harvard University, graduating in 1968.

Filmography

Film

Television

References

External links
 

1947 births
American people of British descent
American male screenwriters
American television directors
Harvard University alumni
Living people
Film directors from Los Angeles
Screenwriters from California